Joanne Durant-Littleton (born 25 May 1975) is a retired female track and field sprinter from Barbados, who represented her native country at the 2000 Summer Olympics in Sydney, Australia. She won a bronze medal in the women's 4x400 metres relay at the 1999 Pan American Games, alongside Melissa Straker, Andrea Blackett, and Tanya Oxley.

Personal Bests

References

1975 births
Living people
Barbadian female sprinters
Athletes (track and field) at the 2000 Summer Olympics
Athletes (track and field) at the 1999 Pan American Games
Olympic athletes of Barbados
Pan American Games bronze medalists for Barbados
Pan American Games medalists in athletics (track and field)
Athletes (track and field) at the 1998 Commonwealth Games
Commonwealth Games competitors for the Bahamas
Medalists at the 1999 Pan American Games
Central American and Caribbean Games medalists in athletics
Olympic female sprinters